The 2015–16 season was Futbol Club Barcelona's 116th in existence and the club's 85th consecutive season in the top flight of Spanish football. Barcelona was involved in six competitions after completing its second continental treble in the previous season.

The season produced a domestic double of La Liga and Copa del Rey wins, with Barça coming out on top in a closely fought title race and defeating newly crowned Europa League winners Sevilla in the Copa del Rey final after extra time. However, Barça failed to clinch its second sextuple after 2009 by losing the Supercopa de España to Copa del Rey runners-up Athletic Bilbao (0–4 away, 1–1 home). Barcelona did manage to finish the year with five trophies, repeating 2011, by clinching the UEFA Super Cup and FIFA Club World Cup titles. Barcelona was also aiming and considered a favourite to repeat as Champions League winners to become the first team in the modern UCL era to do so, but they were knocked out by Atlético Madrid in the quarter-finals (2–1 home, 0–2 away) in a strange repeat of their meeting at the same stage two years prior.

The season was the first since 1997–98 without former captain Xavi, who departed to Al Sadd SC.

Season overview

June
On 7 June, Barcelona announced the transfer of right-wing Aleix Vidal from fellow La Liga outfit and 2015 UEFA Europa League winners Sevilla. The player will join on a five-year deal with a transfer fee of €18 million plus variables. On 9 June, the club announced that right back Dani Alves is set to stay at the club after signing a contract renewal for two years with an option for another year. On 10 June, Barcelona announced that the presidential elections will take place on 18 July, after Josep Bartomeu resigned as president to qualify for re-election. On 25 June, Barcelona announced La Masia graduate Gerard Deulofeu was transferred to English side Everton for a reported fee of €6 million. The player returned to Merseyside after spending the 2013–14 season on loan there under fellow Spaniard manager Roberto Martínez.

July
On 3 July, Barcelona announced that La Masia graduate Martín Montoya would join Italian side Internazionale on a season-long loan with an option for a second. On 6 July, Barcelona announced the signing of Turkey national team captain Arda Turan from Atlético Madrid for €34 million. The player will join on 1 January 2016 after the FIFA transfer ban is lifted. On 18 July, Josep Bartomeu was elected president of Barcelona for the next six years with the third most votes in the club's history. On 21 July, Barcelona kicked off the preseason with a 1–2 victory over Major League Soccer champions LA Galaxy in the 2015 International Champions Cup. Goals from Luis Suárez and Sergi Roberto secured the win in front of a crowd of 93,226 at the Rose Bowl in Pasadena, California. On 23 July, Barcelona were fined €30,000 by UEFA for fans waving pro-Catalan independence banners at the 2015 UEFA Champions League Final. The club maintains its respect for the sanction, yet does not agree with it and its legal services will consider the possibility of questioning the fine at a later time. On 25 July, Barcelona were defeated by English side Manchester United with a scoreline of 1–3 at Levi's Stadium in Santa Clara, California. The lone goal came from Rafinha in the 89th minute of play. On 28 July, Barcelona were defeated in penalties by Chelsea at FedExField in Landover, Maryland. Goals from Luis Suárez and Sandro were enough to earn the regular time draw, however the team lost in penalties 4–2 to end their United States Summer Tour.

August
On 2 August, Barcelona finished their pre-season tour with a visit to Fiorentina at the Stadio Artemio Franchi in Florence. The match ended with a 2–1 loss to the Catalans, the lone Barça goal coming from Luis Suárez. Three days later, on 5 August, Barcelona took on Italian club Roma in the 50th edition of the annual Joan Gamper Trophy. The game ended 3–0 to the Catalan club with goals coming from Neymar, Lionel Messi and Ivan Rakitić. As a result of winning the 2014–15 UEFA Champions League the previous season, the team was eligible to compete in the 2015 UEFA Super Cup versus 2014–15 UEFA Europa League winner Sevilla. The game took place on 11 August at the Boris Paichadze Dinamo Arena in Tbilisi, Georgia, and ended 5–4 in favour of Barcelona, with a brace from Messi and Pedro scoring the winner in extra time. With the win, Barcelona becomes the club with the most international trophies in Europe with 19 international titles.

On 12 August, UEFA announced Messi, Suárez and Real Madrid's Cristiano Ronaldo as the finalists for the 2014–15 UEFA Best Player in Europe Award. On 14 August, Barcelona were soundly defeated by Athletic Bilbao 4–0 in the first leg of the 2015 Supercopa de España at the San Mamés Stadium. On 17 August, Barcelona failed to win their second trophy of the season after a 1–1 draw in the second leg of 2015 Supercopa de España. The lone goal from Messi was not enough to overturn a four-goal deficit from the first leg.

On 20 August, Pedro joined Premier League champions Chelsea for €27 million, rising to €30 million on variables, ending his 11-year association with Barcelona. On 23 August, Barcelona kicked off the 2015–16 La Liga season with a 0–1 victory over Athletic Bilbao in Bilbao. This was the third meeting between the two teams in the last nine days that included the two legs of the 2015 Supercopa de España. On 27 August, Barcelona were drawn into Group E of the 2015–16 UEFA Champions League with Bundesliga side Bayer Leverkusen, Roma and Belarusian champions BATE Borisov. At the same event, Messi was crowned the 2014–15 UEFA Best Player in Europe for the second time in his career. On 29 August, Barcelona played their first match at home against Málaga which ended in a 1–0 victory. Thomas Vermaelen scored the only and his first goal for the club.

September
On 1 September, Barcelona and English side West Ham United agreed on the loan of Alex Song for a second successive season. On 13 September, Barcelona traveled to the Vicente Calderón Stadium to face Atlético Madrid after the FIFA international break. The host took the lead with a goal from Fernando Torres, but goals from Neymar and substitute Messi completed the comeback and notched a 1–2 victory. Barcelona goalkeeper Marc-André ter Stegen made his La Liga debut after only appearing in the Champions League and Copa del Rey last season. On 16 September, Barcelona open their European campaign with a 1–1 draw against Roma at the Stadio Olimpico, with the goal coming from Luis Suárez in the first half. The match ended on a sour note for the squad after Rafinha left the pitch on a stretcher with a leg injury after a tackle from Roma midfielder Radja Nainggolan. The next day, the team released a statement that the player had tear the right anterior cruciate ligament (ACL) and is likely to miss the rest of the season.

On 20 September, Barcelona defeated Levante at home by a 4–1 scoreline with a brace from Messi to stay undefeated in league. Three days later in Balaídos in Vigo, Barça were soundly defeated 4–1 by Celta de Vigo to suffer their first league defeat and drop out of first place in the table. On 26 September, Barcelona were able to bounce back at home with a 2–1 victory over newly promoted Las Palmas. The match was marred with the costly injury to Messi, who suffered a tear in the medial collateral ligament (MCL) of his left knee. The injury will keep the star player out for approximately 6–8 weeks.

On 29 September, Barcelona defeated Bayer Leverkusen in come from behind fashion with a 2–1 victory. The visitors took the lead in the 22nd minute with a corner kick goal from defender Kyriakos Papadopoulos. In the 80th minute, Sergi Roberto leveled the score and two minutes later, Suárez completed the comeback to keep Barça at the top of Group E. For the second straight Champions League match, Barça lose a key player to injury. This time, captain Andrés Iniesta went down with a hamstring injury in his right leg that will keep him out 3–4 weeks.

October
On 3 October, Barcelona was defeated by Sevilla 2–1 away at the Ramón Sánchez Pizjuán Stadium for the club's second loss in last three league games. Neymar scored from a second-half penalty kick as Unai Emery beat Barcelona for first ever time as a manager.

November
On 21 November, Barcelona thrashed Real Madrid 0–4 in the season's first Clásico, played at the Santiago Bernabeu Stadium. Luis Suárez scored a brace while Neymar and Andrés Iniesta also got in the scoresheet; later, Lionel Messi played his first match as a substitute after recovering from his two-month injury. On 24 November, Barcelona beat Roma 6–1 in the Champions League with Barcelona wins Group E.

December
On 14 December, in the draw for the round of 16 of Champions League, Barcelona will face Arsenal as the Group E winner. On 20 December, the club won a record third FIFA Club World Cup title after defeating Argentine side River Plate 3–0 in the final. Luis Suárez scored a record five goals in the tournament including two goals in the final and a hat trick in the semi-final. He was awarded the Adidas Golden ball, given to the best player of the tournament.

On 30 December, Barcelona beat Real Betis 4–0, with Suárez netting a second-half double after Lionel Messi, in his 500th game, scored; Betis also scored an own goal. By scoring 180 goals in 2015 in all competitions, Barcelona set the record for most goals scored in a calendar year, breaking Real Madrid's record of 178 goals scored in 2014.

January
On 11 January 2016, Messi won the FIFA Ballon d'Or for a record fifth time in his career. Luis Enrique's Barcelona has finished an incredibly demanding January with nearly perfect statistics. Just the draw against Espanyol at the Cornellà-El Prat in the first game of the year has held them back in 2016.

February
On 10 February, Barcelona's Copa del Rey draw with Valencia saw Luis Enrique's side set a new club record for unbeaten games, beating Pep Guardiola's 2011 vintage with their 29th game without a loss. On 17 February, Messi made more history after scoring his 300th and 301st goal in La Liga, becoming the first player ever to do so. In the same match, Luis Suárez made up for a penalty miss with his 24th league goal of the season as Barça beat Sporting de Gijón 3–1. On 23 February, Barcelona defeated Arsenal 0–2 away in London, with Messi scoring twice in a feverishly paced encounter, including the 10,000th goal scored in club history. On 25 February, Barcelona extend their alliance with UNICEF through to 2020; the club will increase its annual donation to the charity from €1.5 million to €2 million.

March
On 3 March, Barcelona defeated Rayo Vallecano away 1–5, with Ivan Rakitić and Arda Turan netting one each and Messi scoring a hat-trick. Barça set an all-time record run for 35 games unbeaten in Spanish football, previously held by Real Madrid's 1988–89 side managed by Dutchman Leo Beenhakker. On 8 March, the club announced that the Espai Barça jury unanimously selected the bid by Nikken Sekkei + Pascual i Ausió Arquitectes as the winner of the tender for the design of the new Camp Nou.

On 16 March, Barça defeated Arsenal 3–1 at home (5–1 aggregate) in the round of 16 of the Champions League to gain access to the competition's quarter-finals for the ninth-straight season, and set a new club record for ten consecutive Champions League wins at Camp Nou. On 18 March, in the draw for the quarter-finals of Champions League, Barcelona will face Atlético Madrid. On 24 March, legendary Barcelona player and coach Johan Cruyff died of illness at 68, surrounded by his family in Barcelona; the club mourned him with flags at Camp Nou placed at half-mast.

April
On 2 April, Real Madrid won the second El Clásico match of the league season with a 1–2 victory away, breaking Barcelona's unbeaten record at 39 matches. Players, directors and supporters remembered Johan Cruyff in the form of a video, a mosaic, a minute's silence and applause before the game. On 5 April, Barcelona defeated Atlético Madrid at home (2–1) in the first leg of their Champions League draw, after Luis Suárez's two goals in the second half reversed Barça's early one-goal deficit.

Barcelona lost 1–0 away at the Anoeta Stadium to Real Sociedad on 9 April in La Liga after a goal from the latter club early on. On 13 April, Atlético defeated Barcelona 2–0 (3–2 on aggregate) in the second leg of the Champions League quarter-finals, eliminating the title holders. On 17 April, Barcelona suffered their third consecutive loss of the competition as they were out-played by Valencia in a 1–2 home defeat, despite Messi's second-half goal, his 450th for the club.

On 20 April, Barcelona shook off their recent poor form to absolutely thump Deportivo de La Coruña in a 0–8 away victory, with Luis Suárez scoring four and creating three assists to keep his side in the title race. They continued this form three days later by beating Sporting de Gijón 6–0, with Suárez again scoring four goals (two from penalties), with Messi and Neymar scoring the other two. On 30 April, Barcelona defeated Real Betis 0–2 through Ivan Rakitić and Suárez goals, keeping Barça top of La Liga.

May
On 8 May, Barcelona thrashed Espanyol 5–0 in the season's last home match. Everyone inside Camp Nou played their part in the spectacular pre-game mosaic which bore the message "Som-hi tots" ("Let's go everyone") and also in the minute's silence in memory of the recently passed Manel Vich, the voice of Camp Nou for almost 60 years. On 14 May 2016, Barcelona sealed their sixth La Liga title in eight years with an emphatic 0–3 win over Granada. Two strikes from Luis Suárez in the first half and another late in the second helped the Catalans achieve the club's 24th league success, and confirms the Uruguayan's status as the division's top marksman with 40 goals.

On 21 May, Barcelona and Nike extended their current sponsorship deal. On 22 May, Barcelona recorded a 2–0 extra time victory over Sevilla for their second domestic title of the season and 28th Copa del Rey of all-time. On 27 May, Barcelona and Sergio Busquets are set to renew his contract for five seasons, through to 30 June 2021.

Players

Squad information

From youth squad

Players In

Total spending:  €52 million

Players Out

Total income:  €48 million

Total expenditure:  €4 million

Technical staff

Statistics

Squad, appearances and goals
Last updated on 22 May 2016.

|-
! colspan=18 style=background:#dcdcdc; text-align:center|Goalkeepers

|-
! colspan=18 style=background:#dcdcdc; text-align:center|Defenders

|-
! colspan=18 style=background:#dcdcdc; text-align:center|Midfielders

|-
! colspan=18 style=background:#dcdcdc; text-align:center|Forwards

|-
! colspan=18 style=background:#dcdcdc; text-align:center| Players who have made an appearance or had a squad number this season but have left the club

|}

Goalscorers

Last updated: 23 May 2016

Disciplinary record

Includes all competitive matches. Players listed below made at least one appearance for Barcelona first squad during the season.

Pre-season and friendlies

Competitions

La Liga

League table

Results by round

Matches

Copa del Rey

Round of 32

Round of 16

Quarter-finals

Semi-finals

Final

Supercopa de España

UEFA Champions League

Group stage

Knockout phase

Round of 16

Quarter-finals

UEFA Super Cup

FIFA Club World Cup

References

External links

2015–16 La Liga
Spanish football clubs 2015–16 season
Barcelona
2015-16
2015–16 in Catalan football
Spanish football championship-winning seasons
FIFA Club World Cup-winning seasons